Ludvik Zajc (21 January 1943 – 18 July 2011) was a ski jumper who competed for Yugoslavia. He was born in Jesenice (current Slovenia), and later settled in Norway.

He competed at the 1964 Winter Olympics in Innsbruck, and at the 1968 Winter Olympics in Grenoble.

He served as head coach for the Norwegian national ski jumping team from 1998 to 2002.

References

External links

1943 births
2011 deaths
Sportspeople from Jesenice, Jesenice
Skiers from Oslo
Slovenian male ski jumpers
Olympic ski jumpers of Yugoslavia
Ski jumpers at the 1964 Winter Olympics
Ski jumpers at the 1968 Winter Olympics
Slovenian ski jumping coaches
Slovenian emigrants to Norway
Yugoslav emigrants to Norway